Papilio dialis, the southern Chinese peacock, is a swallowtail butterfly, native to China, Hainan, Taiwan and Burma.

References
Erich Bauer and Thomas Frankenbach, 1998 Schmetterlinge der Erde, Butterflies of the World Part I (1), Papilionidae Papilionidae I: Papilio, Subgenus Achillides, Bhutanitis, Teinopalpus. Edited by Erich Bauer and Thomas Frankenbach. Keltern: Goecke & Evers; Canterbury: Hillside Books 

dialis
Butterflies of Indochina
Butterflies described in 1893